Benarkabud-e Yek (also Romanized as Benārkabūd-e Yek, meaning "Benarkabud 1") is a village in Teshkan Rural District, Chegeni District, Dowreh County, Lorestan Province, Iran. At the 2006 census, its population was 114, in 27 families.

References 

Towns and villages in Dowreh County